This is a list of colleges and universities in the United States Virgin Islands. This list also includes other educational institutions providing higher education, meaning tertiary, quaternary, and in some cases, post-secondary education.

Public institutions

Four-year institutions
University of the Virgin Islands, Charlotte Amalie (Saint Thomas)
University of the Virgin Islands-Kingshill, Kingshill (Saint Croix)

See also
Lists of universities and colleges
List of universities and colleges by country

External links
Department of Education listing of accredited institutions in the United States Virgin Islands

Universities and colleges in the United States Virgin Islands
Virgin Islands, List of colleges and universities in the United States
United States Virgin Islands

Colleges